Roveré della Luna (Roverè in local dialect) is a comune (municipality) in Trentino in the northern Italian region Trentino-Alto Adige/Südtirol, located about  north of Trento.

Roveré della Luna borders the following municipalities: Kurtatsch, Vervò, Margreid, Ton, Salorno and Mezzocorona.

References

External links
Official website 

Cities and towns in Trentino-Alto Adige/Südtirol
Nonsberg Group